Cha Ji-yeon is a South Korean actress and singer. She is known for her roles in dramas such as Scent of a Woman, Taxi Driver and Remarriage & Desires. She also appeared in movies The Treacherous, Love, Lies, Horror Stories 3 and Lost Face.

Personal life 
She married actress and singer Yoon Eun-chae in 2015 and together have one child.

Filmography

Television series

Film

Theater

Ambassadorship 
 6th The Musical Awards Ambassador in 2012

Awards and nominations

References

External links 
 
 

1982 births
21st-century South Korean actresses
Living people
South Korean television actresses
South Korean film actresses